Bernau am Chiemsee station is a railway station in the municipality of Bernau am Chiemsee, located in the Rosenheim district in Bavaria, Germany.

References

Railway stations in Bavaria
Buildings and structures in Rosenheim (district)
Railway stations in Germany opened in 1860
1860 establishments in Bavaria